19 Red Roses is a 1974 Danish crime film directed by Esben Høilund Carlsen and starring Henning Jensen.

Plot
The film follows Detective Ancher (Poul Reichhardt) and his team as they investigate a series of murders that happened over a period of days.  Seemingly unrelated at first, the investigators soon deduce that the killings are connected and stem from an incident that associates of the victims were all involved in.

Cast
 Henning Jensen as William Brehmer
 Poul Reichhardt as Kriminalassistent Ancher
 Jens Okking as Kriminalassistent Brask
 Ulf Pilgaard as Kriminalassistent Rieger
 Holger Juul Hansen as Kriminalkommisær Runge
  as Henri Durant
 Lisbet Lipschitz as Frk. Durant
 Helle Virkner as Marianne Durant
  as Otto Lintz
 Birgit Sadolin as Fru Lintz
 Paul Hüttel as Poul Steffensen
 Bendt Rothe as Janus Bech
 Birgitte Federspiel as Louise Bech
  as Charlotte Nørlund
 Rasmus Windfelt as Charlotte Nørlunds søn
 Preben Lerdorff Rye as Holger Hjort
 Pia Grønning as Bitten Hjort
  as Direktør Pelving
 Vibeke Juul Bengtsson as Direktør Pelvings sekretær
 Bente PuggaardasMüller as Politibetjent
 Per Årman as Spejderfører

Sequel
The film was followed with a sequel, Terror, in 1977.  All of the major characters returned for this followasup.

External links

1974 films
1974 crime films
1970s Danish-language films
Danish crime films